Marcelo Freites (born 12 July 1998) is an Argentine professional footballer who plays as a forward for Godoy Cruz.

Career
Freites is a product of Godoy Cruz's youth academy. Javier Patalano promoted the forward into his senior squad early in the 2019–20 season, with his professional debut arriving on 31 August 2019 in a 3–1 loss away to reigning champions Racing Club; he was substituted on in the second half, in place of Franco González.

Career statistics
.

References

External links

1998 births
Living people
People from San Luis, Argentina
Argentine footballers
Association football forwards
Argentine Primera División players
Godoy Cruz Antonio Tomba footballers
Instituto footballers